Kristian Kirk (born 30 July 1986) is a Danish former professional football goalkeeper, who last played for Næsby BK. He has played one game for Viborg in the Danish Superliga championship in May 2008.

External links
Danish Superliga statistics

1986 births
Living people
Danish men's footballers
Jammerbugt FC players
Viborg FF players
Danish Superliga players

Association football goalkeepers
Næsby Boldklub players